Kishino (written: 岸野) is a Japanese surname. Notable people with the surname include:

Andrew Kishino, Japanese Canadian American voice-over artist and rapper
Katsumi Kishino, Japanese engineer
, Japanese actor and voice actor
, Japanese singer and idol
, Japanese footballer and manager
, Japanese voice actor

Japanese-language surnames